Albert Roccardi (9 May 1864 – 14 May 1934) was an Italian actor of the silent era. He appeared in more than 60 films between 1912 and 1933. He was born in Rome and died in Paris, France.

Partial filmography

 Mr. Barnes of New York (1914)
 The Battle of Frenchman's Run (1915)
 A Modern Thelma (1916)
 My Lady's Slipper (1916)
 Tangled Lives (1918)
 The Virtuous Model (1919)
 Greater Than Fame (1920)
 The Rider of the King Log (1921)
 The Passionate Pilgrim (1921)
 The Inside of the Cup (1921)
 A Pasteboard Crown (1922)
 Destiny's Isle (1922)
 Galloping Hoofs (1924)
 Sunken Silver (1925)
 The Street of Forgotten Men (1925)
 The Belle of Broadway (1926)
 Fools of Fashion (1926)
 Melting Millions (1927)
 Partners in Crime (1928)
 Romance of the Rio Grande (1929)

External links
 
 
 

1864 births
1934 deaths
Italian male film actors
Italian male silent film actors
Male actors from Rome
20th-century Italian male actors